= Azbuka =

Azbuka may refer to:

- Cyrillic script
- Glagolitic script
